Affliction: Banned was a mixed martial arts event co-promoted by Affliction Clothing and Adrenaline MMA. It took place on July 19, 2008 at the Honda Center in Anaheim, California. The card at Banned featured many of the top MMA heavyweight fighters.

Event details
The main event was the return of PRIDE World Heavyweight Championship Fedor Emelianenko fighting against former two-time UFC Heavyweight Champion Tim Sylvia. Emelianenko submitted Sylvia thirty-six seconds into the first round to win in convincing fashion.

After the fight, Randy Couture entered the ring and Emelianenko expressed his desire to fight Couture next. The event saw victories by former UFC Heavyweight Champions Andrei Arlovski and Josh Barnett, with Barnett avenging an earlier loss to Pedro Rizzo, and by former UFC Light-heavyweight Champion Vitor Belfort. Former UFC standout Matt Lindland and former Pride FC standout Antônio Rogério Nogueira won.

Megadeth performed at the event. The announcer was Michael Buffer. The disclosed total fighter payroll for the event was $3,321,000.

Broadcasting
The one-hour undercard was broadcast on Fox Sports Network and The Fight Network while the main fight card was broadcast live on pay-per-view. The UFC scheduled UFC Fight Night: Silva vs. Irvin on Spike TV at the same time as the Affliction event in an attempt to diminish the PPV audience for Banned.

Results

Fighter payroll

 Fedor Emelianenko ($300,000/no win bonus) def.  Tim Sylvia ($800,000)

 Andrei Arlovski ($750,000/$500,000 for show and $250,000 win bonus) def.  Ben Rothwell ($250,000)

 Josh Barnett ($300,000/no win bonus) def.  Pedro Rizzo ($70,000)

 Mark Hominick ($10,000/$5,000 for show and $5,000 win bonus) def.  Savant Young ($7,000)

 Matt Lindland ($300,000/$225,000 for show and $75,000 win bonus) def.  Fabio Negao ($20,000)

 Renato Sobral ($90,000/$60,000 for show and $30,000 win bonus) def.  Mike Whitehead ($50,000)

 Mike Pyle ($20,000/$15,000 for show and $5,000 win bonus) def.  J.J. Ambrose ($5,000)

 Vitor Belfort ($140,000/$70,000 for show and $70,000 win bonus) def.  Terry Martin ($30,000)

 Antônio Rogério Nogueira ($50,000/no win bonus) def.  Edwin Dewees ($15,000)

 Paul Buentello ($80,000/$60,000 for show and $20,000 win bonus) def.  Gary Goodridge ($25,000)

Swing Bout (Canceled): Ray Lizama ($3,000) vs. Justin Levens ($6,000)

Total Base Pay: $2,866,000

Total Bonuses: $455,000

Total Payroll: $3,321,000

Notes
Vernon White, who was originally scheduled to face Antônio Rogério Nogueira, was removed from the card after testing positive for a banned substance following a May bout. Edwin Dewees was announced as a replacement.
 Bravo was scheduled to show Affliction Banned on tape delay on July 20 in the UK.
Aleksander Emelianenko, who was originally scheduled to face Paul Buentello, was removed from the card at the last minute after Emelianenko “didn’t meet CSAC licensing standards”. Gary Goodridge was announced as a replacement.
One swing bout between Justin Levens and Ray Lazama was set to take place after the main event, but the amount of time left and the ring condition prevented it.

References

See also 
 Affliction Entertainment

External links
Official Affliction MMA Site
The Fight Network Affliction Banned Site

Mixed martial arts events
2008 in mixed martial arts
Mixed martial arts in Anaheim, California
Sports competitions in Anaheim, California
Events in Anaheim, California
2008 in California